The 1880 United States presidential election in Vermont took place on November 2, 1880, as part of the 1880 United States presidential election. Voters chose five representatives, or electors to the Electoral College, who voted for president and vice president.

Vermont voted for the Republican nominee, James A. Garfield, over the Democratic nominee, Winfield Scott Hancock. Garfield won Vermont by a margin of 41.66%.

With 69.81% of the popular vote, Vermont would be Garfield's strongest victory in terms of percentage in the popular vote.

The Republican Vice Presidential nominee Chester Alan Arthur was born in Vermont, more specifically in the town of Fairfield.

Results

Results by county

See also
 United States presidential elections in Vermont

Notes

References

Vermont
1880
1880 Vermont elections